Antonio Priuli (10 May 1548 – 12 August 1623) was the 94th Doge of Venice, reigning from 17 May 1618 until his death.  Priuli became Doge in the midst of an ongoing Spanish conspiracy orchestrated by the Spanish Ambassador to Venice, Alfonso de la Cueva, 1st Marquis of Bedmar, a "spy war" that did not end until 1622.

Background, 1548–1618

Priuli was born and died in Venice.  He was the son of Gerolamo Priuli and Elisabetta Cappello.  He enjoyed a successful career as a sailor and a soldier.  He married Elena Barbarigo and the couple had 14 children, which resulted in the need for Priuli to become heavily indebted.

In 1618, he was appointed provveditore of Veglia.  Upon the sudden death of Doge Nicolò Donato only 35 days after his election, Priuli was recalled from Veglia to become Doge.

Doge, 1618–1623

Priuli was hurriedly elected as Doge on 17 May 1618, only days after the death of Donato.  At the time of his election, it was widely believed that the Spanish, led by Bedmar, had landed mercenaries on Venetian territory; that Bedmar had successfully infiltrated the Venetian military; and that a Spanish fleet was poised to take Venice.  Priuli's election began a brutal process of ferreting out individuals suspected of plotting against Venice.  Hundreds were arrested, with or without cause, with attention specially focused on foreign soldiers and sailors.  The manhunt led to the arrest of many actual plotters, but also of many innocent victims, such as Antonio Foscarini, a patrician who was executed on 21 April 1622, after attending an event at the English embassy.

The hysteria ended in 1622, and on 16 January 1623 the Venetian government issued an apology to Alethea Talbot for Foscarini's execution, thus marking a scaling back of the manhunt.  Venice and Spain continued to be at odds throughout the seventeenth century, but things never again reached the fever pitch of 1618–1622.

In February 1623 the Thirty Years War spilled into Venetian territory, though only in the Valtellina.  Priuli was, however, already too ill to participate, and died not long thereafter, on 12 August 1623.

References

This article is based on this article from Italian Wikipedia.

External link

Priuli
Priuli
16th-century Italian nobility
17th-century Italian nobility
17th-century Doges of Venice